Huai Khwang railway halt is a railway halt located in Sila Loi Subdistrict, Sam Roi Yot District, Prachuap Khiri Khan.

Train services 
 Ordinary 254/255 Lang Suan-Thon Buri-Lang Suan

References 
 
 

Railway stations in Thailand